Monte Wesley Lee (born February 9, 1977) is an American baseball coach, who is the current associate head baseball coach and recruiting coordinator for the South Carolina Gamecocks. He played college baseball for the Charleston Cougars from 1996 to 1999. He then served as the head coach of the College of Charleston Cougars (2009–2015) and the Clemson Tigers (2016–2022).

Under Lee, the Cougars reached four NCAA Tournaments, including one NCAA Super Regional.

Playing career
Lee played four seasons of baseball (1996–1999) at College of Charleston.  An outfielder, Lee was a career .333 hitter and had 22 home runs.  He became the program's fifth major-league draftee when he was selected by the St. Louis Cardinals following his senior year and played two seasons of minor league baseball, advancing as high as Single-A.

Coaching career
Lee began his coaching career with a two-year stint (2001–2002) as an assistant at Spartanburg Methodist, a junior college located in his hometown of Spartanburg, South Carolina.  During Lee's tenure, the program reached an NJCAA Division I World Series and set a single-season win record.  Lee then spent six seasons (2003–2008) as an assistant at South Carolina.  The Gamecocks qualified for the NCAA tournament in each of Lee's six seasons and also appeared in two College World Series.

College of Charleston
Lee was hired as the head coach at College of Charleston prior to the start of the 2009 season.  In Lee's second season, the Cougars broke the 40-win mark and appeared in their first NCAA Tournament in his tenure.  At the Myrtle Beach Regional, the Cougars advanced to the regional final with wins over third-seeded NC State and first-seeded Coastal Carolina, but were eliminated with consecutive defeats by Coastal in the championship round.  In 2012, the team shared the Southern Conference regular season title and advanced to another NCAA Tournament, where it went 1–2.  In 2014, Charleston won the conference tournament in their first season in the Colonial Athletic Association. The Cougars then won the Gainesville Regional with a 3–0 record, defeating host Florida and Long Beach State twice. In the Lubbock Super Regional, the Cougars were defeated by Texas Tech in consecutive 1–0 games. In 2015 season, the Cougars won the CAA regular season crown with a 21–3 record, before falling to the UNCW Seahawks in the CAA Championship game. Charleston was selected as a #2 seed in Florida State's Tallahassee Regional, where they went 2–2, finishing second behind the host Seminoles.

In Lee's seven seasons at Charleston, 21 players were selected in the Major League Baseball Draft.  Pitcher Heath Hembree was taken in the 5th round by the San Francisco Giants in 2010 and reached the major leagues in 2013.  A total of six Cougars were taken in that draft, the highest total of Lee's tenure. In his final season at Charleston, the Arizona Diamondbacks selected pitcher Taylor Clarke in the third round, making him the program's highest ever selection.

Clemson
On June 18, 2015, Clemson hired Lee to be their 28th head coach in program history; Lee became only the third head coach at Clemson since 1958 (taking over a program that ranked 8th all-time in Division I wins at the time of his hire).

Monte Lee guided the 2016 Tigers to an ACC baseball tournament title in his first season, defeating the defending ACC Champion Florida State Seminoles in a marathon game by a score of 18–13 at the Durham Bulls Athletic Park in Durham, NC. The win produced the program's first conference title in ten years and Lee's first Clemson team captured the program's 10th conference tournament title and 15th overall ACC championship - both league records. Lee also became the third consecutive Clemson head coach to win the ACC in his first season, joining Bill Wilhelm (1958) and Jack Leggett (1994). The Tigers' 44 victories in 2016 are the second-most victories by a first-year head coach in Clemson history. A strong finish to the season propelled the Tigers to their 41st appearance and the #7 overall national seed to the NCAA tournament.  

In 2022, Lee earned his 500th career victory.  The Tigers defeated College of Charleston on March 29th to give Lee the victory. At the end of the season Lee was fired as head coach after failing to make the NCAA tournament.  It was the second consecutive season that Clemson did not qualify for the tournament.

Return to South Carolina
On August 18, 2022, Lee returned to South Carolina as the team's associate head coach and recruiting coordinator.

Head coaching record
The following is a table of Lee's yearly records as a collegiate head baseball coach.

References

1977 births
Living people
Clemson Tigers baseball coaches
College of Charleston Cougars baseball coaches
College of Charleston Cougars baseball players
South Carolina Gamecocks baseball coaches
People from Spartanburg, South Carolina
Baseball coaches from South Carolina
People from Lugoff, South Carolina